Wallace Turnage (1846 – 1916) was an escaped slave who wrote a narrative that was published for the first time in 2007.

He was born in North Carolina, and was the son of a fifteen-year-old female slave and a white man. He was sold multiple times and made repeated attempts to run away, and succeeded. He lived in New York and New Jersey, working as a waiter, janitor, glass blower, and finally as a watchman.

His manuscript was passed on to his daughter, Lydia Turnage Connolly (1885 – 1984). After her death, it was another 20 years before it was published. In 2007, Civil War historian David W. Blight published A Slave No More: Two Men Who Escaped to Freedom, Including Their Own Narratives of Emancipation, the two men being Turnage and John M. Washington.

A historic marker in Mobile, Alabama, reads as follows:

References

1846 births
1916 deaths
19th-century American slaves
People who wrote slave narratives
People from North Carolina
20th-century African-American people